Floyd's Pro Cycling was a Canadian UCI Continental cycling team established in 2019. The team disbanded at the end of the 2019 season as they could not find a new title sponsor.

The team was created by former cyclist Floyd Landis after receiving 1.1 million dollars from the federal government as part of the Lance Armstrong doping scandal. The team was sponsored by Landis' cannabis shop, Floyd’s of Leadville.

Team roster
As at 31 December 2019

Major wins
2019
 Overall Tour de Taiwan, Jonathan Clarke
Stage 2, Jonathan Clarke
 Stage 4 Joe Martin Stage Race, Alexander Cowan
 Points classification Tour de Langkawi, Travis McCabe
Stage 3, Travis McCabe
 Stage 2 Tour of the Gila, Travis McCabe
 Stage 3 (ITT) Tour of the Gila, Serghei Țvetcov
 Overall Grand Prix Cycliste de Saguenay, Nicolas Zukowsky
 Stage 3a (ITT) Tour de Beauce, Serghei Țvetcov

References

UCI Continental Teams (America)
Cycling teams established in 2019
Cycling teams based in Canada
Defunct cycling teams based in Canada
2019 disestablishments in Canada